The Parliamentary Costs Act 2006 (c. 37) is an Act of the Parliament of the United Kingdom. It consolidates legislation relating to parliamentary costs.

Section 1 - Appointment of taxing officers
This section replaces section 3 of the House of Commons Costs Taxation Act 1847 and section 3 of the House of Lords Costs Taxation Act 1849.

Section 2 - Authorisation of representatives' charges
This section replaces section 3 of the House of Commons Costs Taxation Act 1847 and section 3 of the House of Lords Costs Taxation Act 1849.

Section 3 - Application for assessment
This section replaces the corresponding provision in section 8 of the House of Commons Costs Taxation Act 1847 and the corresponding provision in section 8 of the House of Lords Costs Taxation Act 1849.

Section 4 - Duty to assess: general
Section 4(1) replaces the corresponding provision in section 8 of the House of Commons Costs Taxation Act 1847 and the corresponding provision in section 8 of the House of Lords Costs Taxation Act 1849.

Section 4(2) replaces the corresponding provision in section 8 of the House of Commons Costs Taxation Act 1847, the corresponding provision in section 8 of the House of Lords Costs Taxation Act 1849 and paragraph 13 of Schedule 2 to the Statute Law (Repeals) Act 1993.

Section 4(3) replaces the corresponding provision in section 8 of the House of Commons Costs Taxation Act 1847 and the corresponding provision in section 8 of the House of Lords Costs Taxation Act 1849.

Section 5 - Duty to assess: special cases
Sections 5(1) and (2) replace the corresponding provision in section 10 of the House of Lords Costs Taxation Act 1849.

Section 5(3) replaces the corresponding provision in section 10 of the House of Lords Costs Taxation Act 1849 and the corresponding provision in section 2 of the House of Commons Costs Taxation Act 1879.

Section 5(4) replaces the corresponding provision in section 12 of the House of Lords Costs Taxation Act 1849.

Section 5(5) replaces the corresponding provisions in sections 10 and 12 of the House of Lords Costs Taxation Act 1849 and in section 2 of the House of Commons Costs Taxation Act 1879.

Sections 5(6) and (7) replace the Section 5(5) replaces the corresponding provisions in sections 10 and 12 of the House of Lords Costs Taxation Act 1849.

See also
Parliamentary Costs Act

References
Halsbury's Statutes
Erskine May: Parliamentary Practice
Parliamentary Costs Act 2006 (c. 37): Table of Origins. HMSO. 2007.
The Law Commission and the Scottish Law Commission. Parliamentary Costs Bill: Report on the Consolidation of Legislation relating to Parliamentary Costs. Law Com 298. SLC 202. Cm 6846. June 2006.

External links
The Parliamentary Costs Act 2006, as amended from the National Archives.
The Parliamentary Costs Act 2006, as originally enacted from the National Archives.

United Kingdom Acts of Parliament 2006
Costs